Fátima do Sul is a municipality located in the Brazilian state of Mato Grosso do Sul. Its population was 19,170 (2020) and its area is 315 km².

References

Municipalities in Mato Grosso do Sul